The Saturday Night Live Band (referred to in the closing credits as The Live Band) is the house band of the NBC television program Saturday Night Live (SNL).

Role on Saturday Night Live 
The band consists of mostly jazz, R&B, and some rock musicians and features a strong horn section. They normally play the opening theme music (after the cold opening), musical pieces in between commercial breaks, and the closing theme music "Closing Theme (Waltz in A)," written by founding member Howard Shore. Often, the band will provide the music to a sketch when necessary.

Band leaders and musical directors 

Musician and future Academy Award winning film composer Howard Shore was the original musical director and bandleader from 1975 until 1980.
Singer and songwriter Kenny Vance (who appeared previously as a musical guest on the May 21, 1977 episode) became the musical director for the show's sixth season (1980–81). Original band member and trombonist Tom Malone took over leadership duties under executive producer Dick Ebersol's tenure from 1981 to 1985. Hall & Oates guitarist G.E. Smith came on board as the new musical director once original producer Lorne Michaels returned and stayed in that position until 1995 when lead saxophonist Lenny Pickett was promoted as bandleader.
Katreese Barnes also served as the music director for a time, around the year 2000.
Keyboardist Leon Pendarvis (who has been a member of the band since 1980) is also 2nd musical director alongside Pickett.

Other projects 
Mariah Carey utilized the horn section of the Saturday Night Live Band (Lew Delgatto, Lenny Pickett, George Young, Earl Gardner, and Steve Turre) for her performance of "If It's Over" during her 1992 MTV Unplugged special.

Tom Malone, Lou Marini, and Alan Rubin were members of the Blues Brothers band fronted by SNL cast members John Belushi and Dan Aykroyd. They were also featured in the first Blues Brothers movie, with Malone as a member of fictional lounge act "Murph and the Magic Tones," Rubin as maitre d' of an expensive French restaurant, and Marini as a fry cook at Aretha Franklin's soul food restaurant. Paul Shaffer was also involved in early Blues Brothers performances, but had scheduling conflicts and could not appear in the film, until the sequel.

Members

Current members 
 Leon Pendarvis – keyboards, musical director (1980–present)
 Alex Foster – alto saxophone (1985–90, 1995–present)
 Lenny Pickett – tenor saxophone, musical director (1985–present)
 Steve Turre – trombone (1985–present)
 Shawn Pelton – drums (1992–present)
 Valerie Naranjo – percussion (1995–present)
 James Genus – bass guitar (2000–present)
 Ron Blake – baritone saxophone, flute (2005–present)
 Tuffus Zimbabwe – keyboards (2010–present)
 Maddie Rice – electric guitar (2020–present)
 Summer Camargo – trumpet (2022–present)

Musical directors 

 Howard Shore (1975–1980)
 Kenny Vance (1980–1981)
 Tom Malone (1981–1985)
 G.E. Smith (1985–1995)
 Lenny Pickett (1995-present)

Past members 

Founders
 Bob Cranshaw – bass guitar (1975–80; died 2016)
 Cheryl Hardwick – keyboards (1975–80, 1985–2000; guest 2015)
 Howard Johnson – bass saxophone, tuba (1975–80; died 2021)
 Bert Jones – electric guitar (1975–79)
 Tom Malone – trombone, trumpet (1975–85)
 Lou Marini – tenor saxophone (1975–83)
 Alan Rubin – trumpet (1975–83; died 2011)
 Paul Shaffer – keyboards (1975–80; guest 1982, 2015)
 Dahaud Shaar AKA David Shaw – drums (1975–77; died 2018)
 Howard Shore – alto saxophone (1975–80)
 Mauricio Smith – baritone saxophone (1975–77; died 2002)

1970s additions
 Lew Del Gatto – baritone saxophone (1977–80, 1985–95, 1998–2005)
 Steve Jordan – drums (1977–78)
 Marcus Miller – bass guitar (1978–80)
 Elliott Randall – electric guitar (1979–80)
 Buddy Williams – drums (1978–85)
 David Spinozza – electric guitar (1979–82)
 Georg Wadenius – electric guitar (1979–85)
 George Young – alto and baritone saxophones (1979–80, 1990–95)
 David Sanborn – alto saxophone (1979-80)

1980s additions
 Michael Brecker – tenor saxophone (1980–85; died 2007)
 Ray Chew – keyboards (1980–83)
 Ronnie Cuber – baritone saxophone (1980–83; died 2022)
 Lawrence Feldman – alto saxophone (1980–83)
 Earl Gardner – trumpet (1985–2022)
 Neil Jason – bass guitar (1980–83)
 Chris Palmaro – keyboards (1980–83)
 Buster Poindexter – vocals (1986–87)
 Tom Barney – bass guitar (1983–85, 1995–2000)
 Steve Ferrone – drums (1985–86)
 G.E. Smith – electric guitar (1985–95; guest 2000, 2015)
 Tom Wolk – bass guitar (1985–90; guest 1994; died 2010)
 Chris Parker – drums (1986–91)
 Tony Garnier – bass guitar (1987–89)

1990s additions
 Matt Chamberlain – drums (1991–92)
 Christine Ohlman – vocals (1991–2022)
 Paul Ossola – bass guitar (1991–95)
 Jane Getter – electric guitar (1995)
 Lino Gomez – baritone saxophone (1995–98)
 Yoshiko Hirashige – electric guitar (1995–97)
 Lukasz Gottwald – electric guitar (1997–2007)

2000s additions
 Katreese Barnes – keyboards (2000–10; died 2019)
 Jared Scharff – electric guitar (2007–20)

References

External links 
Official NBC website

Band
Musical groups established in 1975
Musical groups from New York City
1975 establishments in New York City
Radio and television house bands